Chanbar Gharbal may refer to:
 Chanbar Gharbal, Quchan